Ethmia cribravia is a moth in the family Depressariidae. It is found in Yunnan, China.

Adults are sexually dimorphic, with the males having prominent androconial scales on the hindwing.

References

Moths described in 2004
cribravia